Todds Point is an unincorporated community within Shelby County, Kentucky, United States. Its post office  is closed. It was also known as The Point.

References

Unincorporated communities in Shelby County, Kentucky
Unincorporated communities in Kentucky